Statistics of JSL Cup in the 1983 season.

Overview
It was contested by 20 teams, and Yanmar Diesel won the championship.

Results

1st round
Yomiuri 1-1 (PK 3–1) Nippon Steel
Kofu 1-1 (PK 4–1) Toho Titanium
Furukawa Electric 0-1 Nippon Kokan
Tanabe Pharmaceuticals 1-0 Saitama Teachers

2nd round
Yanmar Diesel 5-1 Mitsubishi Motors
Yomiuri 4-2 Fujitsu
Toyota Motors 3-0 Kofu
Fujita Industries 1-0 Mazda
Toshiba 2-2 (PK 4–2) Yamaha Motors
Nippon Kokan 2-1 Sumitomo Metals
Nissan Motors 3-1 Tanabe Pharmaceuticals
Honda 3-1 Hitachi

Quarterfinals
Yanmar Diesel 1-0 Yomiuri
Toyota Motors 1-3 Fujita Industries
Toshiba 1-3 Nippon Kokan
Nissan Motors 2-1 Honda

Semifinals
Yanmar Diesel 1-1 (PK 3–2) Fujita Industries
Nippon Kokan 3-3 (PK 3–4) Nissan Motors

Final
Yanmar Diesel 1-0 Nissan Motors
Yanmar Diesel won the championship

References
 

JSL Cup
League Cup